Groove Blues is an album by saxophonist Gene Ammons recorded in 1958 and released on the Prestige label. The album was recorded at the same session that produced The Big Sound.

Reception 
A review for AllMusic by Scott Yanow stated: "On Jan. 3, 1958, Gene Ammons led one of his last all-star jam sessions for Prestige. The most notable aspect to this date (which resulted in two albums of material) is that it featured among its soloists John Coltrane, on alto".

Track listing 
All compositions by Mal Waldron, except as indicated
 "Ammon Joy" - 13:19
 "Groove Blues" - 9:35
 "Jug Handle" - 10:11
 "It Might as Well Be Spring" (Oscar Hammerstein II, Richard Rodgers) - 11:32

Personnel 
 Gene Ammons - tenor saxophone
 Jerome Richardson - flute (tracks 1-3)
 John Coltrane - alto saxophone (tracks 1, 2 & 4)
 Paul Quinichette - tenor saxophone (track 1 & 2)
 Pepper Adams - baritone saxophone (tracks 1 & 2)
 Mal Waldron - piano
 George Joyner - bass
 Art Taylor - drums

References 

Gene Ammons albums
1961 albums
Prestige Records albums
Albums recorded at Van Gelder Studio
Albums produced by Bob Weinstock